Colin Irwin John Hamilton Drummond  (born 22 February 1951) is a British businessman, and the former CEO of Viridor, and joint CEO of Pennon Group.

Early life
Drummond was born and brought up in Northern Ireland, where his father worked in the shipyard before becoming a priest. He won a scholarship to read classics at the University of Oxford and after working for a short time at the Bank of England, completed an MBA at the Harvard Business School.

Career
From 1992 to 2013, Drummond was chief executive of Viridor, one of the UK's leading recycling, renewable energy and waste management companies, and an executive director of Pennon Group PLC. He was then chairman of Viridor until the end of 2014. Prior to joining Pennon, Drummond was chief executive of Coats Viyella Yarns Division, an executive director of Renold PLC, a consultant with the Boston Consulting Group and an official with the Bank of England.

Drummond was chairman of the Government's 'Living with Environmental Change' business advisory board from 2009 to 2015, of UKTI's Water and Environmental Sector Advisory Group from 2005 to 2012, and of the Environmental Sustainability Knowledge Transfer Network from 2007/08 and chair of the 'WET 10' City Livery Companies from 2008 to 2013. From 1997 to 2015 he was a trustee, and is now honorary vice president of the Calvert Trust Exmoor.

In 2010, he appeared in the Channel 4 television series, Undercover Boss Undercover Boss.

He was appointed an OBE in the Queen's Birthday Honours 2012 for services to technology and innovation, and a Deputy Lieutenant (DL) of Somerset in 2016.

In August 2013 Viridor announced the appointment of Ian McAulay as chief executive of Viridor and executive director of Pennon Group taking effect from September 2013, with Drummond retiring as chief executive and taking up the position of non-executive chairman of Viridor.

Personal life
He met his wife Georgina whilst a student at Oxford. They have two sons. He lists among his hobbies as growing vegetables in the manner of 'peasant farmer.'

References

1956 births
Living people
British chief executives
British corporate directors
Harvard Business School alumni
Boston Consulting Group people
Deputy Lieutenants of Somerset
Officers of the Order of the British Empire